Şekerpınarı Bridge, also called Akköprü, is a Roman bridge in the Taurus Mountains, southern Turkey.

Geography
The bridge carried once a former Turkish state highway. Although still usable, it is now abandoned. The current road course is very close to the bridge. It is between the Turkish state highway  to the east and the Turkish State Railways to the west. Just north of the bridge, there is a spring, which is called Şekerpınarı (literally: "sugar-spring"), and there is a popular picnic area around Şekerpınarı.

History
The bridge was constructed in the late Roman Empire era. It was also used during the Byzantine Empire, the Seljuks of Anatolia, the Karamanids and the Ottoman Empire. In the 14th and 15th centuries, it was the customs post of the Karamanids, who controlled the north of the bridge. It was restored many times, the last one being in 2000-2001.

Architecture

See also 

 List of Roman bridges

References

External links
Images

Pozantı
Ulukışla District
Roman bridges in Turkey
Taurus Mountains
Arch bridges in Turkey
Stone bridges in Turkey
Buildings and structures in Adana Province
Buildings and structures in Niğde Province